Summit Mountain is a summit in Herkimer County, New York in the Adirondack Mountains. It is located northwest of Little Rapids in the Town of Webb. Deer Mountain is located northeast, Sitz Mountain is located west and Mount Electra is located east-southeast of Summit Mountain.

References

Mountains of Herkimer County, New York
Mountains of New York (state)